The Daegu KOGAS Pegasus (in Korean: 대구 한국가스공사 페가수스) is a professional basketball club in the Korean Basketball League (KBL). Established in 1994, the team plays in the KBL since its existence. Since 2021, the club is based at Daegu Gymnasium in Daegu after relocating from Incheon.

Current roster

Enlisted players

Honours

Korean Basketball League 
KBL Championship
 Runners-up: 2018–19

KBL Regular Season
 Runners-up: 2010–11, 2018–19

Cup 
KBL Pro-Am
 Runners-up: 2012

References

External links

 Official website 
 Asia-Basket.com profile

 
Basketball teams in South Korea
Basketball teams established in 1994
Korean Basketball League teams
Sport in Incheon
Sport in Daegu
1994 establishments in South Korea